Leeds is a neighborhood of Kansas City, Missouri, United States.

A post office called Leeds was established in 1890, and remained in operation until 1929. The community's name is a transfer from Leeds, England.

References

Further reading
 KC Q Dives Into Story of Leeds, Where Black Families Flourished in a 'Garden of Eden'
 Leeds, MO, 37th Street

Neighborhoods in Kansas City, Missouri